Thierry Tusseau (born 19 January 1958) is a French former professional footballer who played as a defender. As a player of French side Girondins de Bordeaux (1983–1986), he was a member of the France national team in the 1986 FIFA World Cup and the team that won the European Championship in 1984.

Club career 
Tusseau was born in Nogent-sur-Marne, Val-de-Marne. Throughout his career, he played for FC Nantes-Atlantique (1977–1983), Girondins de Bordeaux (1983–1986), RC Paris (1986–1987), Matra Racing (1987–1988), and Stade de Reims (1988–1991).

International career 
Tusseau was a member of the France national team that won the 1984 European Championship on home soil and also later took part at the 1986 FIFA World Cup with France. In total, he earned 22 international caps (no goals) for the France national team during the 1970s and 1980s.

References

References
  French Football Federation Profile 

1958 births
Living people
Sportspeople from Nogent-sur-Marne
French footballers
Association football midfielders
France international footballers
UEFA Euro 1984 players
UEFA European Championship-winning players
1986 FIFA World Cup players
Ligue 1 players
Ligue 2 players
FC Nantes players
FC Girondins de Bordeaux players
Racing Club de France Football players
Stade de Reims players
Footballers from Val-de-Marne